Wilhelm Kuhe (10 December 1823 – 8 October 1912) was a Czech pianist and piano teacher, composer and administrator born in the city of Prague (modern-day Czech Republic), in the first half of the nineteenth century.

Life
He exhibited a precocious taste for music, and at the age of four picked out Paganini's melodies on the pianoforte from memory. He was taught music by Václav Tomášek, having Julius Schulhoff as a fellow student. He lived in Upper Austria in 1843-44, studying music and preparing for a concert tour with great success in 1844 at Linz, Salzburg, Innsbruck, Augsburg, Munich, and then at Stuttgart.  During his stay in Stuttgart in 1845 he made the acquaintance of a singer possessed of one of the most beautiful baritone voices he had ever had the pleasure to hear called Pischek. They both visited London on the morning of May 1 that year and the following year he played with great success at Mr. Ella's Musical Union in Mayseder's trio. His first concert in London was arranged by Moscheles at the Beethoven Rooms on Harley street. In 1847, at the age of 24, he settled in England, dividing his time between London and Brighton, where he attained popularity as a pianoforte teacher, performer and promoter of concerts.

With remarkable enterprise and spirit, Kuhe showed great enterprise by establishing the annual festival at Brighton which was held by him as a joint conductor from 1870 to 1882, wherein he encouraged native talent by the new works composed at his instance and produced by him, among which, Virginia Gabriel's Evangeline in 1873; John Francis Barnett's cantata, The Good Shepherd, in 1876; Frederic Clay's Lalla Rookh in 1877 and 1878; Frederic Hymen Cowen's The Deluge, and Alfred Cellier's Suite Symphonique in 1878; Walter Macfarren's overture Hero and Leander, Henry Gadsby's The Lord of the Isles, Thomas Wingham's Concert Overture in A, and Sloper's suite in 1879; Leslie's cantata, The First Christmas Morn, Arthur Herbert Jackson's Ballet Suite and W. Macfarren's Symphony in B♭ in 1880: W. Macfarren's Konzertstück in B♭, played by Miss Kuhe, in 1881; Frederick Corder's orchestral Nocturne in 1882, in addition to William Sterndale Bennett's The Woman of Samaria and Arthur Sullivan's The Martyr of Antioch, under the respective direction of their composers. He occasionally appeared in London, where he gave an annual concert in 1846. He was appointed a Professor of the Royal Academy of Music in 1886, position which he held until 1904. His numerous compositions include many drawing-room pieces, fantasias, and studies. He published also many transcriptions and songs.

He published his memoirs, My Musical Recollections, in 1896; the book preserves a number of anecdotes about Wolfgang Amadeus Mozart that Kuhe learned from Wenzel Swoboda, an elderly Prague double bass player who had performed under Mozart's direction. It also preserves an anecdote about Anna Gottlieb, who had performed under Mozart as Pamina in the premiere of The Magic Flute. The volume was read by the late nineteenth century English novelist George Gissing in October 1896.

List of works

Fantasias
Fantasie on Sir Arthur Sullivan’s opera The Chieftain
Fantasie brilliante on motifs from Bizet's Carmem
Fantasie on motifs from Verdi's La Forza del Destino
Fantasie on Verdi's opera La Traviata
Grande fantasie de concert on Flotow's Martha
Fantasia on Austrian Anthem
Victoria Fantasia on National Anthem
Fantasie on Meyerbeer's Dinorah
Fantasia on Rule Britannia

Études
Andante and etude Op. 14
Casta Diva, study in the cantabile from Bellini’s Norma
Charlie is my darling, study in octaves
Silvery Shower, caprice étude Op. 78
Étude de concert

Salon music
Three Songs without words Op. 12
Le Carillon Op. 13
Chanson d'Amour
Romance sans Paroles Op. 17
Le Feu Follet, scherzo capriccioso Op. 38
Gondola
Rosée du soir

Other works
Lieder ohne Worte Op. 12
Galop di Bravura from Howard Glover’s opera Ruy Blas
The Gipsies Revel
Graziella, Op.60
Scène bohémienne, Op.138
Corbeille de Fleurs Valse

See also
 List of Czech composers

References
 
Attribution

Further reading
My musical recollections, Rinsland Press (2008), .
Royal Wedding March, Chappell & Co. London (1869). Pictorial colour lithograph with music by lithographic artist G. DesMaison
Come Back to Erin (Words and music by Claribel), Ditson, Boston. Music score.
Sparkling Shower. Caprice étude pour Piano. Music score.
Slumber-Song and Tarantella from Auber's Masaniello. Music score.

External links
 The Henselt Library at European-American University Public domain scores of rare nineteenth-century piano music.
 IMSLP - Petrucci Music Library The free public domain music library.

1823 births
1912 deaths
19th-century classical composers
20th-century classical composers
Czech classical composers
Czech male classical composers
German male classical composers
Czech classical pianists
German Bohemian people
German classical pianists
Male classical pianists
Musicians from Prague
German Romantic composers
20th-century German composers
19th-century classical pianists
19th-century German composers
German pianists
German male pianists
20th-century German male musicians
19th-century German male musicians